Kang Zhen (born March 1970) is a Chinese scholar and a professor at the College of Arts, Beijing Normal University. He is best known for conducting lecture series about Chinese literature on the CCTV-10 television programme Lecture Room.

Biography
Kang was born in Suide County, Shaanxi in March 1970. He attended Shaanxi Normal University from 1989 to 2000, graduating with a Master of Arts. He earned his Doctor of Letters under the direction of Huo Songlin.

In 2006, he received an invitation to be a lecturer on the television programme Lecture Room shown on CCTV-10. Since then, he has conducted four lecture series–Li Bai, Du Fu, Li Qingzhao and the Eight Great Writers of Tang and Song Dynasties.

Since 2002, he taught at Beijing Normal University. He was deputy director of the Institute of Ancient Chinese Literature from 2003-2004, and he was elected deputy party chief for 2004 and vice-dean of the College of Arts for 2006.

Works

References

External links
 Kang Zhen on Sinaweibo

1970 births
Educators from Shaanxi
Historians from Shaanxi
Living people
Shaanxi Normal University alumni
Academic staff of Beijing Normal University
Writers from Yulin, Shaanxi
People's Republic of China historians